Don Pramudwinai (born 25 January 1950) is a Thai diplomat and politician who is a Deputy Prime Minister and Minister of Foreign Affairs of Thailand. He previously served as the ambassador of Thailand to the United States.

Early life and education
Don attended Wat Suthiwararam and Suankularb Wittayalai Schools. As an undergraduate he studied at the Faculty of Political Science, Chulalongkorn University (1967–1968). He received a BA in political science and an MA in international relations from University of California (UCLA). He also received an MA in international relations from The Fletcher School of Law and Diplomacy at Tufts University.

Career

Don Pramudwinai joined the Ministry of Foreign Affairs in 1974. In 1992 he was appointed director-general of the Department of East Asian Affairs. From 1994 to 1998 he was posted as Thailand's ambassador to Switzerland, Vatican City, and Liechtenstein. From 1999 to 2000 he was the Foreign Ministry spokesperson. From 2000 to 2004 he served as ambassador to China, North Korea, and Mongolia. From 2004 to 2007 he served as ambassador to the European Union. From 2007 until 2009 he served as permanent representative to the United Nations in New York. From 2009 until 2010 he served as ambassador to the United States.

In 2014 he was appointed deputy foreign minister to Foreign Minister Thanasak Patimaprakorn, and in 2015 was elevated to minister of foreign affairs. In an August 2020 Cabinet reshuffle, he was also appointed as deputy prime minister in addition to his position as minister of foreign affairs. 

In 2022 Don has been instrumental in pushing for the restoration of Thai-Saudi relations, this marks the first high-level visit in three decades between the two countries.

Awards and honors
 1998: Knight Grand Cordon of the Most Noble Order of the Crown of Thailand
 2003: Knight Grand Cordon of the Most Exalted Order of the White Elephant
 2004: Knight Commander of the Most Illustrious Order of Chula Chom Klao

References

1950 births
Living people
Don Pramudwinai
University of California, Los Angeles alumni
The Fletcher School at Tufts University alumni
Don Pramudwinai
Don Pramudwinai
Don Pramudwinai
Don Pramudwinai